The Brico Cross Trophy 2016–17 is a season long cyclo-cross competition in Belgium.

Calendar

Men's competition

Women's competition

References

2016 in cyclo-cross
2017 in cyclo-cross